Morcolla is one of 11 districts of the Sucre Province in the Ayacucho region in Peru.

Population
The population of Morcolla is 2,190 people, 1,088 men and 1,102 women.

Geography 
Other mountains are listed below:

Ethnic groups 
The people in the district are mainly indigenous citizens of Quechua descent. Quechua is the language which the majority of the population (85.58%) learnt to speak in childhood, 14.22% of the residents started speaking using the Spanish language (2007 Peru Census).

Administrative division
The populated places in the district are:

References